The Turkey national football team represented Turkey at the FIFA Confederations Cup on one occasion, a sole appearance in 2003. Despite not being the host nation, champions of their confederation or holders of the World Cup, Turkey qualified having placed third at the 2002 World Cup as Germany (2002 World Cup runners-up), Italy (UEFA Euro 2000 runners-up) and Spain (Highest ranked UEFA member in the FIFA rankings at the time) declined to participate.

Record at the FIFA Confederations Cup

Record by opponent

2003 FIFA Confederations Cup

Group B

Turkey v United States

Cameroon v Turkey

Brazil v Turkey

Semi-final

France v Turkey

Third place play-off

Goalscorers

References

Turkey national football team
Countries at the FIFA Confederations Cup